Nocardioides agariphilus is a Gram-positive bacterium from the genus Nocardioides which has been isolated from farming field soil on the Bigeum Island, Korea.

References

Further reading

External links
Type strain of Nocardioides agariphilus at BacDive -  the Bacterial Diversity Metadatabase	

agariphilus
Bacteria described in 2008